Hit and Run is a 1957 American drama film noir directed by Hugo Haas starring Cleo Moore, Hugo Haas, and Vince Edwards.

The movie was Moore's final film appearance. She gained popularity earlier in the 1950s in B-movie film noirs released by Columbia Pictures, for which Moore was a contract player.

Plot
Gus Hilmer, a moneyed garage, property and junkyard owner, falls in love with and marries a showgirl named Julie who is many years younger than himself. This causes tension between Hilmer and Frankie, Gus's young auto mechanic employee whom he has befriended, and treated like a son.

In due course, Frank and Julie develop an emotional attachment.  Frank is drawn to Julie and subsequently plots to get rid of her husband. On a dark, remote road, Frankie runs down Gus with a car, killing him. He and Julie are free to be together and run the garage, or at least they think they are until Gus's twin brother turns up.

Cast
 Cleo Moore as Julie Hilmer
 Hugo Haas as Gus Hilmer/Twin Brother
 Vince Edwards as Frank
 Dolores Reed as Miranda
 Mara Lea as Anita (Credited as Mari Lea)
 Pat Goldin as Undertaker
 John Zaremba as Doctor
 Robert Cassidy as Sheriff 
 Carl Milletaire as Lawyer 
 Dick Paxton as Waiter
 Julie Mitchum as Circus Girl
 Steve Mitchell as Bartender
 Jan Englund as Clara
 Ella Mae Morse as Singer

Production notes
John Zaremba, who played the doctor, would play hospital administrator Dr. Jensen on Ben Casey four years later, starring Vince Edwards. Dolores Reed was cast as Miranda while dating Hugo Haas.

Shown on the Turner Classic Movies show Noir Alley with Eddie Muller on September 4, 2022.

References

External links
 
 
 
 

1957 films
Columbia Pictures films
Film noir
Films directed by Hugo Haas
American crime films
1957 crime films
1950s English-language films
1950s American films